Pidgin Wolof is a pidgin language based on Wolof, spoken in the Gambia.

African-based pidgins and creoles
Languages of the Gambia